The Commandant of Cadets is the ranking officer in charge of the Corps of Cadets at the United States Military Academy at West Point, New York. The commandant is head of the Department of Tactics and, under the superintendent is responsible for the administration, discipline, and military training of cadets at the academy. A model for all cadets, the commandant is an academy graduate of impeccable character and bearing who has demonstrated accomplishment in both academic excellence and active military service in the field.

During the superintendency of Sylvanus Thayer, the corps of cadets was organized into a battalion of two companies with an officer of the army appointed as commander. In 1825, the office was designated as commandant of cadets. William J. Worth was the first officer to bear the title, though he had assumed the office several years previously, following three earlier battalion commanding officers.

Referring to the office in his work on Commandant Emory Upton, academy professor Peter Michie wrote: "His example should be that of the ideal soldier, officer, and gentleman. He should cultivate soldierly honor among the cadets until it attains vigorous growth. He should rebuke with severity the first tendency to prevarication or dishonesty in word or act. With a system of divided responsibility, which ultimately rests on one or two comrades, he should control all by strict and increasing exactions. To make his government successful he should be endowed with the highest soldierly qualities in personal bearing at drill, and even in every act while subject to vision of his corps"

Commandants

References
General references

Inline citations

See also

West Point
Academy alumni, famous list
United States Military Academy